For supervised learning applications in machine learning and statistical learning theory, generalization error (also known as the out-of-sample error or the risk) is a measure of how accurately an algorithm is able to predict outcome values for previously unseen data. Because learning algorithms are evaluated on finite samples, the evaluation of a learning algorithm may be sensitive to sampling error. As a result, measurements of prediction error on the current data may not provide much information about predictive ability on new data. Generalization error can be minimized by avoiding overfitting in the learning algorithm. The performance of a machine learning algorithm is visualized by plots that show values of estimates of the generalization error through the learning process, which are called learning curves.

Definition  

In a learning problem, the goal is to develop a function  that predicts output values  for each input datum . The subscript  indicates that the function  is developed based on a data set of  data points.

Without knowing the joint probability distribution , it is impossible to compute . Instead, we can compute the error on sample data, which is called empirical error (or empirical risk). Given  data points, the empirical error of a candidate function  is:

An algorithm is said to generalize if:

Of particular importance is the generalization error  of the data-dependent function  that is found by a learning algorithm based on the sample. Again, for an unknown probability distribution,  cannot be computed. Instead, the aim of many problems in statistical learning theory is to bound or characterize the difference of the generalization error and the empirical error in probability:

For many types of algorithms, it has been shown that an algorithm has generalization bounds if it meets certain stability criteria. Specifically, if an algorithm is symmetric (the order of inputs does not affect the result), has bounded loss and meets two stability conditions, it will generalize. The second condition, expected-to-leave-one-out error stability (also known as hypothesis stability if operating in the  norm) is met if the prediction on a left-out datapoint does not change when a single data point is removed from the training dataset.

These conditions can be formalized as:

Leave-one-out cross-validation Stability

Expected-leave-one-out error Stability

For leave-one-out stability in the  norm, this is the same as hypothesis stability:

with  going to zero as  goes to infinity.

Algorithms with proven stability 
A number of algorithms have been proven to be stable and as a result have bounds on their generalization error. A list of these algorithms and the papers that proved stability is available here.

Relation to overfitting  

The concepts of generalization error and overfitting are closely related. Overfitting occurs when the learned function  becomes sensitive to the noise in the sample. Thus, the more overfitting occurs, the larger the generalization error.

The amount of overfitting can be tested using cross-validation methods, that split the sample into simulated training samples and testing samples. The model is then trained on a training sample and evaluated on the testing sample. This test sample allows us to approximate the expected error and as a result approximate a particular form of the generalization error.

Many algorithms exist to prevent overfitting. The minimization algorithm can penalize more complex functions (known as Tikhonov regularization), or the hypothesis space can be constrained, either explicitly in the form of the functions or by adding constraints to the minimization function (Ivanov regularization).

The approach to finding a function that does not overfit is at odds with the goal of finding a function that is sufficiently complex to capture the particular characteristics of the data. This is known as the bias–variance tradeoff. Keeping a function simple to avoid overfitting may introduce a bias in the resulting predictions, while allowing it to be more complex leads to overfitting and a higher variance in the predictions. It is impossible to minimize both simultaneously.

References

Further reading
 
 
 Mohri, M., Rostamizadeh A., Talwakar A., (2018) Foundations of Machine learning, 2nd ed., Boston: MIT Press. 
 Moody, J.E. (1992), "The Effective Number of Parameters: An Analysis of Generalization and Regularization in Nonlinear Learning Systems", in Moody, J.E., Hanson, S.J., and Lippmann, R.P., Advances in Neural Information Processing Systems 4, 847-854. 
 White, H. (1992b), Artificial Neural Networks: Approximation and Learning Theory, Blackwell.

Classification algorithms